The 120th Regiment of Foot was an infantry regiment of the British Army, formed in 1763 by regimenting independent companies and disbanded in 1764.

References

External links
120th Regiment of Foot

Infantry regiments of the British Army
Military units and formations established in 1763
Military units and formations disestablished in 1764